Kenny Martin Cunningham Brown (born 7 June 1985) is a Costa Rican professional footballer who plays as a winger.

Playing career
Cunningham started his professional career at Pérez Zeledón and played for Carmelita, Alajuelense and Herediano before signing up with San Carlos in September 2009.
He moved abroad to join Japanese second division side Gainare Tottori in February 2012 but missed a large part of the season due to a rare disease. In January 2013 he moved to Bolivia to play for The Strongest.

Wellington Phoenix
On 26 July 2013, Cunningham signed a two-year contract with New Zealand A-League club Wellington Phoenix. It was said that fellow Costa Rican and Wellington player Carlos Hernandez first recommended him to Phoenix coach Ernie Merrick.

In the 2013–14 season, Cunningham scored 7 goals in 23 appearances, the same number as fellow Phoenix and Costa Rica teammate Carlos Hernández. His long-range goal in a 5–0 home victory over the Melbourne Victory was named goal of the year for the Phoenix in 2013–14.

International career
Cunningham made his international debut for Costa Rica in an international friendly against Cuba on 12 December 2011. He was a 69th-minute substitute and helped secure a 1–1 draw with a 90th-minute equaliser.

Cunningham made his full debut later that month, playing 90 minutes in a 2–0 away victory against Venezuela. As of May 2014, he earned 13 caps, scoring one goal. He represented his country in 2 FIFA World Cup qualification matches and played at the 2013 CONCACAF Gold Cup but was left out of the 2014 World Cup squad.

International goals
Scores and results list Costa Rica's goal tally first.

Honours
Individual
 CONCACAF League Team of the Tournament: 2017

Personal life
His twin brother Kevin is also a professional footballer, they played together at Carmelita.

Kenny and Kevin are related to Australian Rory Cunningham.

References

Kenny Cunningham irá a préstamo al Uruguay de Coronado, nación.com, 11 January 2016

External links
 
 

1985 births
Living people
People from Limón Province
Association football wingers
Costa Rican footballers
Costa Rica international footballers
2013 CONCACAF Gold Cup players
Municipal Pérez Zeledón footballers
A.D. Carmelita footballers
L.D. Alajuelense footballers
C.S. Herediano footballers
A.D. San Carlos footballers
Gainare Tottori players
The Strongest players
Wellington Phoenix FC players
Santos de Guápiles footballers
C.D. Malacateco players
Costa Rican expatriate footballers
Expatriate footballers in Japan
Expatriate footballers in Bolivia
Expatriate footballers in Guatemala
Expatriate association footballers in New Zealand
Costa Rican expatriate sportspeople in Japan
Costa Rican expatriate sportspeople in Bolivia
Costa Rican expatriate sportspeople in Guatemala
J2 League players
Bolivian Primera División players
A-League Men players
Liga FPD players
Liga Nacional de Fútbol de Guatemala players
New Zealand Football Championship players
Costa Rican twins
Twin sportspeople